Rin-ne is a Japanese anime television series, produced by Brain's Base and directed by Seiki Sugawara, based on the manga by Rumiko Takahashi. The first season aired 25 episodes from April 4 to September 20, 2015, and the second season is airing from April 9, 2016. The screenplay is written by Michiko Yokote and the music composed by Akimitsu Honma.

Series overview

Episodes

Season 1

Season 2

Season 3

References 

Rin-ne
Lists of anime episodes